Kenta Araki (荒木 健太, Araki Kenta, born 6 April 1995) is a Japanese water polo player who competed in the 2020 Summer Olympics.

At the club level he played for Australian side UWA Torpedoes in 2018.

福岡工業高校出身

References

1995 births
Living people
Water polo players at the 2020 Summer Olympics
Japanese male water polo players
Olympic water polo players of Japan
Expatriate water polo players
Japanese expatriate sportspeople in Australia
Asian Games silver medalists for Japan
Asian Games medalists in water polo
Water polo players at the 2018 Asian Games
Medalists at the 2018 Asian Games
21st-century Japanese people